Agatha of Lorraine (c. 1120 – April 1147) was the wife of Renaud III, Count of Burgundy. She was the daughter of Simon I, Duke of Lorraine and his wife Adelaide of Leuven.

Agatha's children with her husband included:
 Beatrice I, Countess of Burgundy
 Two other sons and three other daughters who died in childhood
She fell sick in March 1147 and died two weeks later.

External links

1120 births
1147 deaths
Year of birth uncertain
12th-century French people
12th-century French women
Countesses of Burgundy